Adriano Vignoli (11 December 1907 – 16 June 1996) was an Italian professional road bicycle racer.

He was born in Sasso Marconi. In 1934, Vignoli won one stage both in the 1934 Tour de France and in the 1934 Giro d'Italia.

Major results

1931
Giro del Piave
1934
Tour de France:
Winner stage 16
Giro d'Italia:
Winner stage 7
8th place overall classification
1937
Giro d'Italia:
10th place overall classification

External links 

Official Tour de France results for Adriano Vignoli

1907 births
1996 deaths
Sportspeople from the Metropolitan City of Bologna
Italian male cyclists
Italian Tour de France stage winners
Cyclists from Emilia-Romagna